L'Amour was a music venue in Brooklyn, New York, run by Mike and George Parente. L'Amour opened as a disco club in 1978, transformed into a rock club in 1981 and closed in February 2004. It was promoted as the "Rock Capital of Brooklyn". Commonly pronounced "La-Morz" by patrons, the venue hosted many of hard rock and heavy metal's biggest artists, including Iron Maiden, Kiss, Megadeth and Metallica, as well as frequently featuring underground bands from across the country and across the globe. The original L'Amour in Brooklyn remained a relevant part of the rock-metal scene for almost 25 years.

Notable acts 
Some notable acts that performed at the venue included: Attacker, Accept, Amorphis, Anthrax, Anvil, Big Bad Wolf, Biohazard, Blue Öyster Cult (under their original name Soft White Underbelly), Cannibal Corpse, Carnivore, Cheap Trick, Corrosion of Conformity, Covenant, Cro-Mags, Destruction (band), Dirty Rotten Imbeciles, Dream Theater, Entombed, Exodus, Faith No More, Fates Warning, Ace Frehley, The Functional Idiots, Godflesh, Guns N' Roses, GWAR, Hatebreed, Immolation, In Flames, Iron Maiden (performing as Charlotte and the Harlots), Jane's Addiction, King Diamond, Kiss, Kix, Kreator, Krokus, Lacuna Coil, L.A. Guns, Liege Lord, Life of Agony, Lillian Axe, Yngwie J. Malmsteen, Manowar, Steve Marriott, Megadeth, Metallica, Moonspell, Motörhead, Murphy's Law, Nightwish, Nuclear Assault, Opeth, Overkill, the Joe Perry Project, Poison, Pyro Myth, Lips, Queensrÿche, Quiet Riot, the Ramones, Raven, Ruby Topaz, Saigon Kick, Savatage, Saxon, Sir Duke,Sepultura, Six and Violence, Sheer Terror, Slayer, Soundgarden, Stormtroopers od Death, Stryper, Testament, TORA!, TNT, Toxic Elvis, Toxik, Trouble,TORRA,Robin Trower, T.T. Quick, Twisted Sister, Type O Negative, Venom, Vinnie Vincent Invasion, Voivod, W.A.S.P., Wendy O Williams, Whiplash, White Lion, LACE, X Zebra.

Spinoff clubs
L'Amour spawned two spinoff rock clubs in the mid-1980s: L'Amour East in Queens and L'Amour Far East on Long Island.

L'Amour East (also known as “The Edge” for some years) (DNZ Korean supermarket, currently), located on Queens Boulevard (77-00, specifically) in Elmhurst, Queens (Newtown, formerly), south Queens, New York City, NY 11373, existed for several years (circa 1983–1988), riding the coattails of the Brooklyn club's fame. The Queens club not only showcased rock performers and some of the top glam metal bands of the era, but as a dance club, also hosted many freestyle music acts.

L'Amour Far East, situated in Commack on Long Island, folded soon after its 1987 opening.

A new L'Amour existed in Staten Island from April 2006 to December 2009, dubbing itself the "Rock Capitol of Staten Island".

Paramount Theatre
The historic Paramount Theatre in Staten Island, which opened as a cinema in 1930, was converted to a rock venue in 1980, operated by the owners of L'Amour. The club enjoyed success for several years, hosting bands like Venom, Metallica, the Rods and Vandenberg during 1982 and 1983. When the Paramount closed after several years, the owners opened L'Amour East.

A 2017 article about the property states that it was used as a location for concerts for a short time but closed in 1980. Some restoration was started after 2008 but was halted; it restarted again in 2016. Some scenes for movies were filmed here. The plan was to "turn it into a restaurant, catering hall, and events venue". A 2018 report added that the restoration was still far from being completed at that time.

Prominent DJs 
 Alex Kayne is considered L'Amour's most popular and influential DJ. The Brooklyn native came to L'Amour in 1979 as a regular, began as resident DJ there from 1980 to 1985, and subsequently deejayed there on and off until the venue closed. He was the venue's original metal DJ, its first VJ, and its longest resident DJ. Kayne also worked at L'Amour East, and was the only resident DJ at the Staten Island L'Amour. Noting his influence, Metal Hammer said that Kayne "played a big part in breaking American and European metal bands". Kayne continues working the U.S. club and concert venue scene.
 Chuck Kaye, a local metal DJ from Staten Island, was known as the "Roar of L'Amour". Kaye was the house DJ at L'Amour from 1985 to 1988. As Jagger Kaye, he is now an acting coach.
 Jo Roxstaar (billed as DJ JoRoxstaar!), was asked to DJ for L'Amour East in Queens (by the promoter for the club at the time, ????) after resigning the VJ position from L'Amour in Brooklyn. Jo had worked alongside Alex Kayne at L'Amour in Brooklyn from 19xx through 19xx and later went on to DJ at the Cat Club in Manhattan, (handing the DJing gig at L'Amour East to Alex Rude, who spun for about one year) followed by DJ Taso.
 Michel Gutman was L'Amour Far East's only DJ (after the opening night, when WBAB's Fingers hosted the show), spinning a mixture of all types of metal and hard rock.

Impact on NYHC 

In its later years, L'Amour gave rise to many acts in the hardcore scene, including Agnostic Front, Carnivore, Biohazard, Type O Negative, Life Of Agony, Candiria, Full Blown Chaos, Madball, Most Precious Blood, Pro-Pain, Pyro Myth, Sick of it All and Sworn Enemy.

L'Amour in print: L'Amour: Rock Capital of Brooklyn 
Longtime L'Amour DJ Alex Kayne recalled the tales of his time at L'Amour and documented the history of the club in an as-yet unpublished book, L'Amour: Rock Capital of Brooklyn, including interviews, photos and fan materials.

References

Former music venues in New York City
1978 establishments in New York City
2004 disestablishments in New York (state)